Aeronautica may refer to:

 Aeronautica Militare, the air force of the Republic of Italy
 Italian Co-belligerent Air Force from 1943 until 1945 colloquially known as Aeronautica del Sud
 Special Administrative Unit of Civil Aeronautics, Colombian government agency also known as Aeronáutica Civil
 Aeronáutica Industrial S.A., a Spanish aeronautical company
 Aeronautica Macchi, the former name of Alenia Aermacchi
 Aeronáutica Agrícola Mexicana SA, a now defunct Mexican aircraft manufacturer
 Aeronáutica (Angola), an Angolan airline
 Aeronautica Imperialis, a tabletop miniature wargame
 Aeronáutica (Seville Metro)